Count Your Blessings, Woman is a studio album by American country music artist, Jan Howard. It was released in June 1968 on Decca Records and contained 11 tracks. Most of the disc featured covers of popular songs of the era. The album's title track was spawned as a single, becoming a top 20 song on the Billboard country chart in 1968. Additionally, the album would reach peak positions on the American country albums chart. It was reviewed positively by Billboard magazine.

Background and content
Jan Howard reached her peak commercial success as a country artist during the mid sixties. On Decca Records, she had a series of top 20 and top 40 singles. This included the top ten songs "Evil on Your Mind", "Bad Seed", and a number one duet with Bill Anderson titled "For Loving You". In 1968 Anderson penned Howard's popular solo single, "Count Your Blessings Woman". Her sixth studio collection was named for the single. The album was recorded at Bradley's Barn, located in Mount Juliet, Tennessee. It was recorded in several sessions between 1967 and 1968. It was produced entirely by Owen Bradley. 

The disc was a collection of 11 tracks. New songs on the disc included the title track and the Dallas Frazier composition, "But Not for Love My Dear". Covers of country songs were featured as well. Among them were Jack Greene's number one country single "You Are My Treasure" and  Tammy Wynette's number one song "Take Me to Your World". It also featured Lynn Anderson's top ten song, "Promises, Promises" and the Dolly Parton/Porter Wagoner duet single, "The Last Thing on My Mind". Pop hits of the era were also featured like Cher's "You'd Better Sit Down, Kids" Jimmie Rodger's "It's Over" and "Cliff Richard's "The Minute You're Gone".

Release, reception and singles
Count Your Blessings, Woman was released in June 1968 on Decca Records. It was the sixth studio release of Howard's career and her fifth with the Decca label. It was distributed in a vinyl record format. Six songs were included on "Side A" while five songs were included on "Side B". The album debuted on the Billboard Top Country Albums chart on July 6, 1968 and peaked at number 27 on July 20, 1968. It was Howard's fourth album release to peak on the country albums chart. 

Count Your Blessings, Woman received positive reviews from critics. Allmusic gave the album 5 out of 5 possible stars. In Billboard'''s 1968 review, critics commented, "This one will melt off the shelves, for Miss Howard's performances are loaded with sincerity and heart." The title track was first released in February 1968. It peaked at number 16 on the Billboard Hot Country Singles chart later that year, becoming Howard's fifth top 20 song on the country singles chart. The single also peaked at number 6 on the Canadian RPM Country Tracks chart. It was her first single to reach the Canada country chart.

Track listing

Personnel
All credits are adapted from the liner notes of Count Your Blessings, Woman''.

 Owen Bradley – producer
 Hal Buksbaum – photography
 Jan Howard – lead vocals, background vocals

Chart performance

Release history

References

1968 albums
Jan Howard albums
Albums produced by Owen Bradley
Decca Records albums